Kristopher Todd Vernarsky (born April 5, 1982) is an American former professional ice hockey player. He played 17 games in the National Hockey League with the Boston Bruins between 2003 and 2004. The rest of his career, which lasted from 2002 to 2011, was spent in various minor leagues. Internationally Vernarsky played for the United States at two World Junior Championships.

Biography
Vernarsky was born in Detroit, Michigan. As a youth, he played in the 1996 Quebec International Pee-Wee Hockey Tournament with the Detroit Little Caesars minor ice hockey team.

Vernarsky was drafted 51st overall by the Toronto Maple Leafs in the 2000 NHL Entry Draft from the Ontario Hockey League's Plymouth Whalers. While playing for the Whalers, his right were traded to the Boston Bruins for Ric Jackman. He played 17 regular season games for the Bruins, in which he scored one goal and collected two penalty minutes.

Vernarsky's lone NHL goal came in Boston's 6-4 home win against the Montreal Canadiens on February 6, 2003.  It was the game-winning goal. 

He is married with three children, and resides near of Detroit. After retiring from playing in 2012, he became a welder and fabricator, and coached minor ice hockey.

Career statistics

Regular season and playoffs

International

References

External links

1982 births
Living people
American men's ice hockey centers
Boston Bruins players
Chicago Hounds (ice hockey team) players
Florida Everblades players
Ice hockey people from Detroit
Motor City Mechanics players
Plymouth Whalers players
Port Huron Flags players
Port Huron Icehawks players
Providence Bruins players
Toronto Maple Leafs draft picks
Wheeling Nailers players